Hardthausen am Kocher is a town in the district of Heilbronn in Baden-Württemberg in southern Germany.

Geography

Location 
Hardthausen lies in the east of the county of Heilbronn in the lower Kocher valley on the southern edge of the Harthausen Forest.

References

Heilbronn (district)